The Cadiangullong Creek, a mostlyperennial river that is part of the Lachlan sub-catchment of the Murrumbidgee catchment within the Murray–Darling basin, is located in the Central West region of New South Wales, Australia.

Course and features 
The Cadiangullong Creek (technically a river) rises on the slopes of Mount Canobolas below Watts Pinnacle, and flows generally south by west before reaching its confluence with the Belubula River north of the settlement of Millamong. The creek descends  over its  course.

See also 

 List of rivers of New South Wales (A-K)
 Rivers of New South Wales

References

External links
 

Tributaries of the Lachlan River
Rivers of New South Wales
Cabonne Council
Cowra Shire